Arnara is a comune (municipality) in the Province of Frosinone in the Italian region Lazio, located about  southeast of Rome and about  southeast of Frosinone.

Arnara borders the following municipalities: Ceccano, Frosinone, Pofi, Ripi, Torrice. Sights include the medieval castle.

Twin towns
 Bistra, Croatia

References

Cities and towns in Lazio
Articles which contain graphical timelines